ICO or Ico may refer to:

Science and technology
 ICO (file format), a file format used for icon images in Microsoft Windows
 Index of Central Obesity, a measurement of abdominal obesity
 Indian Computing Olympiad, an annual computer programming competition
 Initial coin offering, the initial price of a new cryptocurrency
 Intermediate circular orbit, a type of satellite orbit

Organizations
 ICO Global Communications, a mobile satellite services company based in Reston, Virginia, US
 Catalan Ornithological Institute (Institut Català d'Ornitologia), a non-profit for the study of birds in Catalonia
 Illinois College of Optometry, a private college in Chicago, Illinois, US
 Information Commissioner's Office, a UK regulator
 Institute of Contemporary Observation, a Chinese non-governmental organization
 International Coffee Organization, a group for enhancing cooperation between nations dealing in coffee
 International Commission for Optics, a commission for knowledge in optics
 International Communist Opposition, a group of critics of the Communist movement
 International Council of Ophthalmology, a body serving associations of ophthalmologists
 Instituto de Crédito Oficial, a Spanish state-owned development bank
 Irish Chamber Orchestra, a chamber orchestra in Ireland
 Irish College of Ophthalmologists, the national body for ophthalmology training in Ireland
 Israel Chamber Orchestra, a chamber orchestra in Israel

Other uses
 Cocos (Keeling) Islands, ITU code ICO
 Ico, a 2001 action-adventure video game for the PlayStation 2
 Ico, el caballito valiente, a 1983 Argentine animated film
 Icó, a town in Ceará, Brazil
 Ico Hitrec (1911–1946), Croatian football player

See also
 IKO (disambiguation)